Mick O'Brien (born 25 March 1954) is an Australian boxer. He competed in the men's bantamweight event at the 1972 Summer Olympics.

References

1954 births
Living people
Australian male boxers
Olympic boxers of Australia
Boxers at the 1972 Summer Olympics
Place of birth missing (living people)
Bantamweight boxers